Yacumama means "Mother of water" (from Quechua yaku "water" and mama "mother"), referring to an enormous serpent believed to live in the Peruvian Amazon Rainforest. The Yacumama is believed to be the mother of all creatures of the water. According to legend, the Yacumama would suck up any living thing that passed within 100 steps of it. To protect themselves, the local indigenous peoples would blow on a conch horn before entering the water, believing that the yacumama would reveal itself if it was present. It is sometimes believed to be a giant snake or caecilian known as the Minhocão.

In North America, the Cherokee Natives American told a similar legend of Tlanusi, a leech the size of a house that dwelt in the Hiwassee River near present-day Murphy, North Carolina.

References

Indigenous Amazonian legendary creatures
Peruvian folklore
Legendary serpents